Dasyvesica nepomuca is a species of snout moth in the genus Dasyvesica. It is found in Bolivia.

References

Moths described in 1925
Epipaschiinae